Konstantinos Maleas (Κωνσταντίνος Μαλέας) (Constantinople, 1879 - Athens, 1928) was one of the most important Post-impressionist Greek painters of the 20th century. Along with Konstantinos Parthenis, he is sometimes considered Greece's most important modern artist.

Biography 
Maleas was born and grew up in Constantinople, far away from the Greek artistic centre in Athens. The young painter avoided therefore the influence of the Munich School that dominated Athenian Art. He studied at the Phanar Greek Orthodox College and then left for Paris in 1901 at an age of 23 years to study initially architecture. In Paris he eventually decided to study painting until 1908 with Henri Martin.

In 1913 he returned to Greece, initially in Thessaloniki and then based in Athens. In 1917 he became founding member of the avant-garde art group Ομάδα Τέχνη,  which imported the international contemporary art movements of the time to Greece. He travelled extensively in Greece, Western Europe, Palestine and Egypt where he drew some of the subjects for his famous landscapes.
Apart from painting, he was  also involved in  public discussion of the modernisation of the Greek language. He was a friend of Glenos, Delmouzos and Triantafylidis. He  illustrated the first alphabet book in the new modern Greek language Demotiki (Αλφαβητάρι με τον ήλιο), and wrote articles for  newspapers such  as Nouma, Elefthero Vima , as well as writing for a number of art journals.  Maleas was  recognised for his artistic contribution by the Greek Government,  which awarded him  its 'Highest Acknowledgement of Letters and Arts'.

Work 
Maleas work was influenced by the work of Paul Cézanne, Paul Gauguin, Vincent van Gogh, and by the art movements of symbolism, impressionism and fauvism. His paintings are characterised by  very light and bright colours, the large brushes that revolutionalised the stagnant Athenian art of the time. Most art critics  condemned his work , and it was only Fotos Politis that recognised the value of Maleas's work, also  urging young artists to learn from his paintings. Maleas remains one of the most popular Greek modern artists, and his works are exhibited at the National Gallery of Athens and elsewhere.

Gallery

See also 
 Munich School
 National Gallery of Athens

External links 
 Paintings of Maleas
 The founders of a realistic world article by Efi Strouza, in Greek

References 

1879 births
1928 deaths
Constantinopolitan Greeks
Greek artists
19th-century Greek painters
20th-century Greek painters
Artists from Istanbul
Emigrants from the Ottoman Empire to Greece